Dancing Stars is the Austrian version of Dancing with the Stars and is shown on ORF eins in Austria.

Professional partners 
Color key:

 Winner
 Runner-up
 3rd place
 Celebrity partner was eliminated first for the season
 Celebrity partner withdrew from the competition

Judges

The judges in season one were Hannes Nedbal, Thomas Schäfer-Elmayer, Nicole Burns-Hansen and Dagmar Koller. In season two Harald Serafin replaced Dagmar Koller. In season three hallo

Guggi Löwinger replaced Harald Serafin. In season four Alfons Haider replaced Guggi Löwinger and in season five Alfons Haider was replaced by Klaus Eberhartinger. In season six, Hannes Nedbal, Thomas Schäfer-Elmayer and Nicole Burns-Hansen stayed as judges and were joined by a celebrity judge each week. In season seven, Hannes Nedbal, Thomas Schäfer-Elmayer and Nicole Burns-Hansen were joined by Balázs Ekker. In season eleven, the judges were Karina Sarkissova, Dirk Heidemann, Nicole Hansen and Balázs Ekker.

Key
 Judge
 Professional dancer
 Host
 Contestant

Hosts
In seasons 1, 2 and 3 the show was hosted by Alfons Haider (Main Host) and Mirjam Weichselbraun (Backstage and Interviews). In season 4 Mirjam Weichselbraun replaced Alfons Haider and winner of Season 3 Klaus Eberhartinger took her place. In season 5, Mirjam Weichselbraun was the main host while Alfons Haider took Klaus Eberhartinger's place. Since season 6, Mirjam Weichselbraun is the main host of the show and Klaus Eberthartinger interviews the couples backstage.

Seasons

Season 1
In the first season, no couple had to leave the first show and only two pairs were left in the final show. In all other seasons, one couple had to leave the first show and three pairs were left in the final show. In the fourth season, the final show was split on two evenings. In the fifth season, men and women were split for the first two shows (qualification rounds).
 Mat Schuh (singer and entertainer) with Kelly Kainz (8th place)
 Arabella Kiesbauer (host) with Balázs Ekker (7th place)
 Peter Rapp (ORF host) with Julia Polai (6th place)
 Patricia Kaiser (Miss Austria 2000 and track and field athlete) with Alexander Kreissl (5th place)
 Stefano Bernardin (actor) with Christina Auer (4th place)
 Barbara Rett (ORF host) with Manfred Zehender (3rd place)
 Toni Polster (ex-soccer player) with Michaela Heintzinger (2nd place)
 Marika Lichter (musical actress) with Andy Kainz (winner)

Season 2
 Gerda Rogers (astrologer) with Andy Kainz (10th place)
 Ulrike Beimpold (actress and comedian) with Manfred Zehender (9th place)
 Edi Finger jun. (radio-sportscaster) with Nicole Kuntner (8th place)
 Barbara Karlich (talkshow host) with Alexander Zaglmaier (7th place)
 Gregor Bloéb (actor) with Michaela Heintzinger (6th place)
 Simone Stelzer (singer) with Alexander Kreissl (5th place)
 Hans Georg Heinke (journalist and newscaster) with Elke Gehrsitz (4th place)
 Nicole Beutler (actress) with Balázs Ekker (3rd place)
 Andreas Goldberger (ex-ski jumper) with Julia Polai (2nd place)
 Manuel Ortega (singer) with Kelly Kainz (winner)

Season 3
 Timna Brauer (singer and artist) with Manfred Zehender (10th place)
 Hera Lind (bestselling author) with Alexander Kreissl (9th place)
 Stephanie Graf (ex-runner) with Andy Kainz (8th place)
 Michael Konsel (ex-soccer player) with Nicole Kuntner (7th place)
 Harry Prünster (host) with Michaela Heintzinger (6th place)
 Nina Proll (actress) with Balázs Ekker (5th place)
 Michael Tschuggnall (Starmania winner 2002) with Alice Guschelbauer (4th place)
 Zabine Kapfinger (singer) with Alexander Zaglmaier (3rd place)
 Peter L. Eppinger (Ö3 host) with Julia Polai (2nd place)
 Klaus Eberhartinger (singer, EAV frontman) with Kelly Kainz (winner)

Season 4

Couples

Scoring chart

Red numbers indicate the lowest score for each week.
Green numbers indicate the highest score for each week.
 indicates the couple eliminated that week.
 indicates the winning couple.
 indicates the runner-up couple.
 indicates the third-place couple.

Average dance chart

Dance order

Week 1 

Individual judges scores in charts below (given in parentheses) are listed in this order from left to right: Alfons Haider, Nicole Burns-Hansen, Thomas Schäfer-Elmayer and Hannes Nedbal.

Running order

Week 2 

Individual judges scores in charts below (given in parentheses) are listed in this order from left to right: Alfons Haider, Nicole Burns-Hansen, Thomas Schäfer-Elmayer and Hannes Nedbal.

Running order

Week 3 

Individual judges scores in charts below (given in parentheses) are listed in this order from left to right: Alfons Haider, Nicole Burns-Hansen, Thomas Schäfer-Elmayer and Hannes Nedbal.

Running order

Week 4 

Individual judges scores in charts below (given in parentheses) are listed in this order from left to right: Alfons Haider, Nicole Burns-Hansen, Thomas Schäfer-Elmayer and Hannes Nedbal.

Running order

Week 5 

Individual judges scores in charts below (given in parentheses) are listed in this order from left to right: Alfons Haider, Nicole Burns-Hansen, Thomas Schäfer-Elmayer and Hannes Nedbal.

Running order

Week 6 

Individual judges scores in charts below (given in parentheses) are listed in this order from left to right: Alfons Haider, Nicole Burns-Hansen, Thomas Schäfer-Elmayer and Hannes Nedbal.

Running order

Week 7 

Individual judges scores in charts below (given in parentheses) are listed in this order from left to right: Alfons Haider, Nicole Burns-Hansen, Thomas Schäfer-Elmayer and Hannes Nedbal.

Running order

Week 8 

Individual judges scores in charts below (given in parentheses) are listed in this order from left to right: Alfons Haider, Nicole Burns-Hansen, Thomas Schäfer-Elmayer and Hannes Nedbal.

Running order

Week 9 

Individual judges scores in charts below (given in parentheses) are listed in this order from left to right: Alfons Haider, Nicole Burns-Hansen, Thomas Schäfer-Elmayer and Hannes Nedbal.

Running order

Season 5
 Christoph Fälbl (actor and comedian) with Julia Polai (12th place)
 Marie-Christine Friedrich (actress) with Alexander Zaglmaier (11th place)
 Andy Lee Lang (singer and pianist) with Nicole Kuntner (10th place)
 Gerhard Zadrobilek (ex-cyclist) with Alice Guschelbauer (9th place)
 Maggie Entenfellner (columnist) with Gerhard Egger (8th place)
 Vincent Bueno (winner of ORF casting show Musical!) with Christina Auer (7th place)
 Gitta Saxx (Playmate of the century) with Balázs Ekker (6th place)
 Sandra Pires (singer) with Alexander Kreissl (5th place)
 Tini Kainrath (singer) with Manfred Zehender (4th place)
 Udo Wenders (singer) with Babsi Koitz (3rd place)
 Ramesh Nair (testimonial and choreographer) with Michaela Heintzinger (2nd place)
 Claudia Reiterer (journalist and TV host) with Andy Kainz (winner)

Season 6

 James Cottriall (singer) with Roswitha Wieland (12th place)
 Christine Kaufmann (Golden Globe winning actress) with Werner Figar (11th place)
 Markus Wolfahrt (singer) with Alice Guschlbauer (10th place)
 Reinhard Nowak (actor) with Kelly Kainz (9th place)
 Uwe Kröger (singer) with Babsi Koitz (8th place)
 Dieter Chmelar (journalist) with Kathrin Menzinger (7th place)
 Cathy Zimmermann (model and presenter) with Christoph Santner (6th place)
 Mirna Jukić (swimmer) with Gerhard Egger (5th place)
 Alfons Haider (entertainer) with Vadim Garbuzov (4th place)
 Mike Galeli (actor) with Julia Polai (3rd place)
 Alexandra Meissnitzer (Alpine skier) with Florian Gschaider (2nd place)
 Astrid Wirtenberger (singer) with Balazs Ekker (winner)

Season 7

 Katerina Jacob (actress) with Christoph Santner (12th place)
 Albert Fortell (actor) with Lenka Marosiová (11th place)
 Michael Schönborn (actor) with Maria Jahn (10th place)
 David Heissig (actor) with Kathrin Menzinger (9th place)
 Sueli Menezes (author) with Florian Gschaider (8th place)
 Wolfram Pirchner (TV presenter) with Anna Chalak-Bock (7th place)
 Dolly Buster (actress) with Gerhard Egger (6th place)
 Eva Maria Marold (actress) with Thomas Kraml (5th place)
 Brigitte Kren (actress) with Willi Gabalier (4th place)
 Marco Ventre (musician) with Babsi Koitz (3rd place)
 Frank Schinkels (footballer) with Roswitha Wieland (2nd place)
 Petra Frey (singer) with Vadim Garbuzov (winner)

Season 8

 Katharina Gutensohn (skier) with Christoph Santner (12th place)
 Doris Schretzmayer (actress) with Gerhard Egger (11th place)
 Rudi Roubinek (actor) with Babsi Koitz (10th place)
 Gerald Pichowetz (actor) with Roswitha Wieland (9th place)
 Monika Salzer (columnist) with Florian Gschaider (8th place)
 Gregor Glanz (singer) with Lenka Pohoralek (7th place)
 Biko Botowamungu (boxer) with Maria Jahn (6th place)
 Susanna Hirschler (actress) with Vadim Garbuzov (5th place)
 Angelika Ahrens (TV presenter) with Thomas Kraml (4th place)
 Lukas Perman (singer) with Kathrin Menzinger (3rd place)
 Marjan Shaki (singer) with Willi Gabalier (2nd place)
 Rainer Schönfelder (skier) with Manuela Stöckl (winner)

Season 9

 Andrea Buday (socialite) with Thomas Kraml (10th place)
 Andrea Puschl (TV presenter) with Christoph Santner (9th place)
 Daniel Serafin (son of Harald Serafin) with Roswitha Wieland (8th place)
 Morteza Tavakoli (actor) with Julia Burghardt (7th place)
 Erik Schinegger (former skier) with Lenka Pohoralek (6th place)
 Lisbeth Bischoff (royal expert) with Gerhard Egger (5th place)
 Melanie Binder (sister of Mirjam Weichselbraun) with Danilo Campisi (4th place)
 Hubert Neuper (former ski-jumper) with Kathrin Menzinger (3rd place)
 Marco Angelini (singer) with Maria Santner
 Roxanne Rapp (daughter of Peter Rapp) with Vadim Garbuzov

Season 10

Season 11

Season 12

Season 13

Highest Scoring Dancers

Special Episodes

Season 1 
No Special Episodes were aired.

Season 2 
After the finale of the second season a "Dancing Stars Best of" was aired.

Season 3  
After the finale of the third season a "Dancing Stars Best of" was aired. 
After the "Best of" of Season 3 there was a special episode called "Dancing Stars – Die Traumhochzeit" (Dancing Stars – The Dream Wedding) in which the professional ballroom dancers Balázs Ekker and Alice Guschelbauer got married.

Season 4  
Before the start of season four, ORF aired the reality show Dance with Me in which the private lives of the professional dancers were shown.
After the fourth season, there was a special episode called "Dance for Europe" in which the couple to represent Austria at the Eurovision Dance Contest 2008 was selected. The couples to participate in this episode were:

 Julia Polai with Peter L. Eppinger
 Alexander Kreissl with Simone Stelzer
 Alice Guschelbauer with Michael Tschuggnall
 Balázs Ekker with Nicole Beutler
 Michaela Heintzinger with Gregor Bloéb
 Manfred Zehender with Christine Reiler
 Alexander Zaglmaier with Zabine Kapfinger
 Nicole Kuntner with Dorian Steidl

Andy and Kelly Kainz who represented Austria in the Eurovision Dance Contest 2007 (5th place) did not participate in this special episode due to conflicting schedules.
The winners were Nicole Kuntner and Dorian Steidl who later came second last at the Dance Contest in Glasgow.

Season 5  
Another "Best of" was aired before the start of season 5. 
During season five, a dance course was aired in which the professional dancers taught the viewers the basics of the cha-cha-cha, rumba, jive, samba, paso doble, English waltz, slow foxtrot, quick step, tango and Viennese waltz.

Season 6–10 
No Special Episodes were aired.

Season 11 
After each show of Season 11, an episode of "Dancing Stars Extra" was aired in which the viewers got exclusive glimpses behind the scenes of the show.

References

External links
 Austrian website of Dancing Stars

 
2005 Austrian television series debuts
2000s Austrian television series
2010s Austrian television series
German-language television shows
Non-British television series based on British television series
ORF (broadcaster) original programming